French Polynesia competed as Tahiti at the 2011 Pacific Games in Nouméa, New Caledonia between August 27 and September 10, 2011. As of June 28, 2011 Tahiti has listed 410 competitors.

Tahiti won the first gold medals of the games in the Va'a competitions.

Archery

Tahiti has qualified 8 athletes.

Men
Heiarii Roo
Stephane Fabisch
Kevin Chang Chen Chang
Hauarii Winkelstroeter
Teiva Winkelstroeter
Tearii Winkelstroeter

Women
Daniele Gras
Temaruata Mousson

Athletics

Tahiti has qualified 31 athletes.

Men
Christian Chee Ayee
Gregory Bradai
Teiva Brinkfield
Frederic Burquier -  5000m,  Marathon
Tumutai Dauphin -  Shot Put
Matahiarii Faatau
Robin Hilaire
Raihau Maiau -  Long Jump
Francky Maraetaata
Rick Mou
Ted Peni
Georges Richmond -  Marathon,  10000m
Hiti Teaua
Jean Jacques Tekori
Simon Thieury -  400m Hurdles
Gilles Valdenaire
Patrick Viriamu

Women
Anne Sophie Barle
Hereiti Bernardino -  3000m Steeplechase
Heiata Brinkfield -  1500m
Sophie Bouchonnet
Veronique Boyer -  Triple Jump,  High Jump
Gardon Chaumard -  5000m
Dolores Ablavi Dogba -  Pole Vault
Terani Kali Faremiro -  Long Jump,  High Jump,  Heptathlon
Sophie Gardon -  Marathon,  10000m
Timeri Lamorelle
Astrid Montuclard -  3000m Steeplechase
Toimata Mooria
Taiana Mothe
Teumere Lucie Tepea -  Pole Vault

Badminton

Tahiti has qualified 9 athletes.

Men
Leo Cucuel
Remi Rossi
Rauhiri Goguenheim
Quentin Rossi
Jean-Sebastien Bedrune
Patrick Rossi

Women
Elisabeth Tehani Giau
Ingrid Ateni
Florence Barrois

Basketball

Tahiti has qualified a men's and women's team.  Each team can consist of a maximum of 12 athletes

Men -  Team Tournament
Ariirimarau Meuel
Eddy Commings
Haunui Apeang
Hitirama Tapi
Larry Teriitemataua
Maui Tepa
Michel Audouin
Rahitiarii Teriierooiterai
Rehiti Sommers
Taihia Maitere
Tavae Teihotu

Women -  Team Tournament
Alizze Lefranc
Ingrid Raita Etaeta
Lucie Maitere
Maea Lextreyt
Marie-Jeanne Ceran-Jerusalemy
Mehiti Tuheiava
Myranda Bonnet
Naiki Iorss
Oceane Lefranc
Orama Laille
Tahia Teriierooterai
Vanina Potiron

Bodybuilding

Tahiti has qualified 18 athletes.

Men
Stéphane Matke -  -75 kg
Maurice Tchan -  -65 kg
Gary Colombani
Alberto Shan
Poenui Stanley Bruneau
Anthony Bac -  -70 kg
Emmanuel Buchin -  -90 kg
Yip Tauhiro -  -100 kg
Steeve Wilton Wong Foen
Teva Michel Brault
Piheirii Ferdino Terupe
Stanley Serge Bruneau -  -85 kg
Mataira Teriipaia
Marere Léonard Coquil

Women
Anne-Marie Vongue -  -55 kg
Maima Ah Sha
Avera Pervenche Maihota
Christina Aeho Lefoc

Boxing

Tahiti has qualified 9 athletes.

Men
Hoani Marescot -  -52 kg
Jauson Marunui Tuihaa -  -56 kg
Karihi Tehei -  -60 kg
Jean-Louis Albertini -  -64 kg
Albert Temaititahio -  -69 kg
Heiarii Mai
Pure Nena
Richardet Mahanora -  -91 kg
Heimana Rurua -  91 kg and Over

Canoeing

Tahiti has qualified 27 athletes.

Men
Manatea Bopp Dupont -  V6 500m,  V12 500m
Kevin Ceran Jerusalemy -  V6 500m,  V6 30 km,  V12 500m
Teva Ebb -  V1 15 km,  V6 500m,  V6 1500m,  V6 30 km,  V12 500m
Vetea Toi -  V6 500m,  V6 30 km,  V12 500m
Tainuiatea Vairaaroa -  V6 500m,  V6 1500m,  V6 30 km,  V12 500m
Hans Heiva Paie Amo -  V1 500m,  V6 500m,  V6 30 km,  V12 500m
Teihotu Dubois -  V6 1500m,  V6 30 km,  V12 500m
Hiromana Flores -  V6 1500m,  V12 500m
Manutea Millon -  V6 1500m,  V12 500m
Anathase Ragivaru -  V6 1500m,  V12 500m
Taaroa Dubois -  V12 500m
Tuarii Neri -  V12 500m

Women
Hinatea Bernadino -  V1 500m,  V1 10 km,  V6 500m,  V6 1500m,  V6 20 km,  V12 500m
Jessica Deane -  V6 500m,  V12 500m
Puarui Guntaro -  V6 500m,  V6 1500m,  V6 20 km,  V12 500m
Mereani Marakai -  V6 500m,  V6 1500m,  V6 20 km,  V12 500m
Poerava Rooarii -  V6 500m,  V12 500m
Sandreane Taputuarai -  V6 500m,  V6 1500m,  V6 20 km
Maria Iotua -  V6 1500m,  V12 500m
Moevai Lucas -  V6 1500m,  V6 20 km
Chantal Bigot -  V12 500m
Martine Fan -  V12 500m
Brenda Maoni -  V12 500m
Tenaturanui Maono -  V12 500m
Virginia Parau -  V12 500m
Poerava Teipoarii -  V12 500m
Shirley Deane -  V6 20 km

Football

Tahiti has qualified a men's and women's team.  Each team can consist of a maximum of 21 athletes.

Men -  Team Tournament
Xavier Samin
Jean-Claude Chang Koei Chang
Stephane Faatiarau
Tauraa Marmouyet
Teheivarii Ludivion
Donavan Bourebare
Garry Rochette
Jonathan Tehau
Taufa Neuffer
Teaonui Tehau
Hiroana Poroiea
Lorenzo Tahau
Steevy Chong Hue
Stanley Atany
Efrain Araneda
Temarii Tinorua
Sebastian Labayen
Vetea Tepa
Billy Mataitai
Mikael Roche
Gilbert Meriel

Women
Poroni Turana
Mariko Izal
Maruina Tom Sing Vein
Vaimiti Ioane
Angela Taiarui
Ninauea Hioe
Tihani Tokoragi
Maima Marmouyet
Maite Teikiavaitoua
Mohea Hauata
Meimiri Alvarez
Roselyne Tepea
Patricia Yakeula
Tiere Apo
Celine Francois
Linda Rua
Poerava Apo
Tehani Tarano
Tehina Peterano
Mataha Faura
Adriana Frelin

Golf

Tahiti has qualified 8 athletes.

Men
Hugues Beaucousin -  Team Tournament
Mahatua Berniere -  Team Tournament
Heimoana Sailhac -  Team Tournament
Raimana Tunoa -  Team Tournament

Women
Coraline Petras -  Team Tournament
Dina Salmon -  Team Tournament
Moea Simon -  Team Tournament
Vaiana Tehaamatai -  Team Tournament

Judo

Tahiti has qualified 19 athletes.

Men
Elden Brinckfield
Cedric Delanne
Romain Desfour
Toanui Lucas
Laurent Sachet
Corentin Le Goff
Jerome Michaud
Aiurahi Raihauti
David Chevalier
Michael Matyn
Jeremy Picard

Women
Vaiana Girard
Laetitia Wuilmet
Vaiana Firuu
Jade Teai
Reia Tauotaha
Hinatea Camaille
Naumi Tehei
Vaihei Vahirua

Karate

Tahiti has qualified 6 athletes.

Men
Mauahiti Teriitehau -  Team Kumite,  -67 kg
Reiarii Delord -  84 kg and Over,  Team Kumite
Taearii Flores -  Individual Kata
Antoine Samoyeau -  Team Kumite,  -84 kg
Vehia Delano Putaa -  Team Kumite,  Open
Tuterai Mendelson -  Team Kumite

Powerlifting

Tahiti has qualified 10 athletes.

Men
Jean Paul Soenarman-Abdallah
Jules Raphael Maruae
Yannick Tumata Punuarii
Andy Faremiro -  -120 kg
Edwin Tamatoa Tauhiro -  120 kg & Over

Women
Augustine Pothier
Tatiana Yan
Catarina Richmond
Moeara Catarina Richmond
Juanita Cilia Terupe

Rugby Sevens

Tahiti has qualified a men's and women's team.  Each team can consist of a maximum of 12 athletes.

Men
Arnold Temahu
Taitearii Mahuru
Tainui Marc Ah-Lo
Yannick Tetuanui Gooding
Haley Teuira
Pan Choun Wong Sung
Kalani Teriimanihinihi Clark
Gabriel Tehaameamea
Olivier Teva Marea
Hei-Mana Cyril Ah-Min
Hiroteraiarii Tauhiro
Jason Hnagere

Women
Mereana Mou Fat
Herenui Tehuiotoa
Hanaley Teuira
Anais Heimata Temarii
Isabelle Pito
Eva Eupea e Pito
Monique Moeata Tokoragi
Madeleine Tehaameamea
Florine Tevero
Daiana Teuru
Marthe Tevero
Eliana Taiti

Sailing

Tahiti has qualified 8 athletes.

Jessee Besson -  Laser Men
Nicolas Gayet
Hinanui Veronique
Isabelle Barbeau
Jennifer Delattre -  Mixed Hobie Cat,  Mixed Hobie Cat Team
Teiva Veronique -  Mixed Hobie Cat,  Mixed Hobie Cat Team
Teva Arnaud Bourdelon -  Mixed Hobie Cat Team
Teva Le Calvic -  Mixed Hobie Cat Team

Shooting

Tahiti has qualified 4 athletes.

Moeava Bambridge -  Point Score Team,  Single Barrel Team
Gino Mourin -  Double Barrel Team,  Point Score Team,  Single Barrel Team,  Double Barrel Individual
Jean-Francois Teiki Nanai -  Double Barrel Team
Hiro Pratx -  Double Barrel Team,  Point Score Team,  Single Barrel Team

Surfing

Tahiti has qualified 3 athletes.

Men
Heifara Tahutini -  - Mixed Longboard
Jocelyn Poulou -  - Surf

Women
Patricia Rossi -  Ondine

Swimming

Tahiti has qualified 4 athletes.

Men
Anthony Clark -  4 × 100 m Freestyle Relay,  4 × 200 m Freestyle Relay,  4 × 100 m Medley Relay
Hugo Lambert -  4 × 100 m Freestyle Relay,  4 × 200 m Freestyle Relay,  4 × 100 m Medley Relay,  400m Freestyle
Heimanu Sichan -  4 × 100 m Freestyle Relay,  4 × 200 m Freestyle Relay,  4 × 100 m Medley Relay,  5 km Open Water,  400m IM
Ranui Teriipaia -  50m Breaststroke,  100m Breaststroke,  4 × 100 m Freestyle Relay,  4 × 200 m Freestyle Relay,  4 × 100 m Medley Relay,  200m Breaststroke,

Table Tennis

Tahiti has qualified 10 athletes.

Men
Ocean Belrose -  Mixed Double Tournament,  Team Tournament,  Double Tournament
Tinihau-O-Terai Klouman -  Team Tournament,  Single Tournament,  Double Tournament
Alize Belrose -  Single Tournament,  Team Tournament
Yoan Lossing -  Team Tournament
Kenji Hotan -  Team Tournament

Women
Turikirau Thunot -  Team Tournament,  Double Tournament
Brenda Lui -  Team Tournament
Melveen Richmond -  Mixed Double Tournament,  Team Tournament,  Double Tournament
Tina Mii -  Team Tournament
Alize Gaumet -  Team Tournament

Taekwondo

Tahiti has qualified 16 athletes.

Men
Francois Mu -  -54 kg,  Team Tournament
Paraita Brothers -  -63 kg
Kuaoleni Mercier -  -74 kg
Levan Tiaoa -  Team Tournament
Tutetoa Tchong -  -58 kg
Raihau Chin -  -68 kg,  Team Tournament
Reynald Chan -  -80 kg,  Team Tournament
Hamanatua Mu -  87 kg & Over

Women
Audrey Vognin -  -53 kg
Raihau Tuaotaha -  -62 kg
Amaiterai Tetuanui
Chaveta Sangue -  -49 kg
Yasmina Feuti -  -57 kg
Averii Gatien -  -67 kg
Anne-Caroline Graffe -  73 kg & Over
Poenaki Roche

Tennis

Tahiti has qualified 8 athletes.

Men
Patrice Cotti
Raiarii Yan
Bruno Laitame
Landry Lee-Tham
Adrien Lee Tham Prevost

Women
Ravahere Rauzy
Catherine Yan
Estelle Tehau

Triathlon

Tahiti has qualified 5 athletes.

Men
Alexandre Delattre -  Mixed Team Sprint
Romain Lambert -  Mixed Team Sprint,  Sprint
Benjamin Zorgnotti

Women
Manuella Heitz -  Sprint,  Mixed Team Sprint
Jessica Levaux -  Sprint

Volleyball

Beach Volleyball

Tahiti has qualified a men's and women's team.  Each team can consist of a maximum of 2 members.

Men -  Team Tournament
Dino Tauraa
Vatea Tauraa

Women -  Team Tournament
Kahaialanie Layana Tauraa
Ramata Temarii

Indoor Volleyball

Tahiti has qualified a men's and women's team.  Each team can consist of a maximum of 12 members.

Men -  Team Tournament
Wilson Tuitete Bonno
Vaianuu Mare
Thierry Tearikinui Fauura
Terii Steve Tauraa
Marc Vaki
Eric Kalsbeek
Donavan Tahema Teavae
Benjamin Leprado
Edouard Mare
Mauri Maono
Davidson Rupea
Jean-Yves Vaki

Women -  Team Tournament
Louisa Lokelani Vero
Valeria Paofai Epse Vaki
Matirita Stephanie Moua
Yvette Vaea Paofai
Moetu Temaui
Gilda Mainanui Tavaearii
Mathilda Teumere Paofai
Rachele Hamau
Teapua Zinguerlet
Maimiti Patricia Mare
Onyx Le Bihan
Raurea Temarii

Weightlifting

Tahiti has qualified 1 athletes.

Women
Claudine Yu Hing -  -53 kg Snatch,  -53 kg Total,  -53 kg Clean & Jerk

Men 
Roopinia Honoura Brandon

References

2011 in French Polynesian sport
Nations at the 2011 Pacific Games
Tahiti at the Pacific Games